The flag of the state of Kansas was adopted in 1927. The elements of the state flag include the Kansas state seal and a sunflower. This original design was modified in 1961 to add the name of the state at the bottom of the flag.

Official description 
The official flag of Kansas is represented by a dark-blue silk rectangle representing Kansas arranged horizontally with the state seal aligned in the center.  Above the seal is a sunflower which sits over a bar of gold and light blue. Below the seal is printed the name of the state "KANSAS".

Seal of Kansas

The state seal centered on the flag tells the history of Kansas and his figures representing pioneer life.  The seal contains:
 Landscape with a rising sun (the east)
 River and steamboat (commerce)
 Settler's cabin and a man plowing a field (agriculture) [foreground]
 Wagon train heading west (American expansion)
 Indians hunting American Bison (the buffalo are fleeing from the Indians)
 Cluster of 34 stars (top of the seal, representing Kansas's admission as the 34th state)
 State motto "Ad Astra per Aspera" - Latin : "To the Stars through Difficulties" (above the stars)
The thirty-four stars clustered at the top of the seal identify Kansas as the 34th state to be accepted into the Union of the United States. Kansas state law provides that the flag is to be used on all occasions when the state is officially represented.

History 
The flag of Kansas was designed in 1925 by Hazel Avery and first used in a Fourth of July parade in Lincoln, Kansas. Officially adopted by the Kansas State Legislature in 1927 and modified in 1961 (the word "Kansas" was added below the seal in gold block lettering). First flown at Fort Riley by Governor Benjamin S. Paulen in 1927 for the troops at Fort Riley and for the Kansas National Guard.

From 1925 to 1927, Kansas used a state banner instead of a flag. The Kansas state banner, which consisted of a large sunflower and the word "Kansas" on a blue field, was intended to be hung from a horizontal bar, rather than a vertical flag pole. It was given a unique design to avoid "competition" with the United States flag. However, after the banner was rejected for display in Washington, D.C., and generated complaints for its awkward method of hanging, the state legislature adopted a state flag that saw the addition of the word "Kansas" at the bottom in 1961 but has otherwise retained its original design.

According to the North American Vexillological Association (NAVA), the state banner exists today as an official alternative to the state flag. The organization's website features the banner – a lone sunflower on a blue field – and attributes it to Adjutant General Joe Nickell. However, the Kansas State Historical Society describes the same design as a flag submitted by Albert T. Reid before the state banner was adopted, and makes no mention of its status as an alternative flag.

See also

Flags of the Governors of the U.S. States
State of Kansas
Symbols of the state of Kansas
Great Seal of the State of Kansas

References

External links
Kansas State Flag

Kansas
Symbols of Kansas
Kansas